Abrek Arkadyevich Barsht  (Russian: Абрек Аркадьевич Баршт) (December 2, 1919, March 21, 2006) was a Soviet Jewish pilot, colonel and Hero of the Soviet Union.

He fought during World War II, was the commander of 118th special reconnaissance-spotter aviation regiment, 2nd Air Army. He was awarded Hero of the Soviet Union on April 10, 1945.He died in 2006 and was buried at the Nikolskoe Cemetery in St. Petersburg.

References

1919 births
2006 deaths
Heroes of the Soviet Union
Soviet Jews in the military
Soviet Air Force officers